Anthidium sertanicola is a species of bee in the family Megachilidae, the leaf-cutter, carder, or mason bees.

Distribution
Brazil
Paraguay

References

sertanicola
Insects described in 1964